Volochayevka-1 is a rural locality (a (selo)  in  Smidovichsky District of the Jewish Autonomous Oblast, Russia. Population:

References

Rural localities in the Jewish Autonomous Oblast